Rosarigasinos (Gangs from Rosario) is a 2001 Argentine film, written and directed by Rodrigo Grande and starring Federico Luppi and Ulises Dumont.  The film is also known as Presos del Olvido in Spain.

The film was produced by Adolfo Aristarain, José Martínez, and José A. Martínez Suárez; the associate producer was Alfredo Suaya and was partly funded by the INCAA.

Plot
The picture tells of two prison friends who cope with life outside jail after being paroled.

Tito (Federico Luppi) and Castor (Ulises Dumont) are two robbers whose failed scheme landed them in the Rosario prison for 30 years. Before being jailed, however, the duo stashed much cash near the Paraná River. They plan on getting back to it as soon as they're released.

Thirty years later, however, their insecurities and the pressures of being re-adjusted to society, threaten to ruin their perfect crime.

Cast
 Federico Luppi as Tito
 Ulises Dumont as Castor
 María José Demare as Morocha
 Francisco Puente as El Gordo
 Gustavo Luppi as Young Tito
 Enrique Dumont as Young Castor
 Saul Jarlip as Ramoncito Fernández

Distribution
The film had its premiere in Argentina on June 19, 2001.

The film was shown at various film festivals, including: the Mill Valley Film Festival, United States; the Chicago Latino Film Festival, USA; the Lleida Latin-American Film Festival, Spain; the Los Angeles Latino Film Festival, USA; the Bogota Film Festival, Colombia; and others.

Awards
Wins
 Huelva Latin American Film Festival: Silver Colon; Best Actor, Ulises Dumont; Special Jury Award, Rodrigo Grande; 2001.
 Mar del Plata Film Festival: AMUCI Jury - Special Mention, Ruy Folguera; Best Actor Ulises Dumont and Federico Luppi; 2001.
 Argentine Film Critics Association Awards: Silver Condor; Best Music, Ruy Folguera; 2002.
 Lleida Latin-American Film Festival: Best First Work, Rodrigo Grande; 2002.

Nominations
 Argentine Film Critics Association Awards: Silver Condor; Best Actor, Ulises Dumont; Best Actor, Federico Luppi; Best New Actor, Francisco Puente; Best Original Screenplay, Rodrigo Grande; Best Supporting Actress, María José Demare; 2002.

References

External links
 
 Rosarigasinos at the cinenacional.com 
  

2001 films
2000s crime comedy-drama films
Argentine crime comedy-drama films
Argentine independent films
2000s Spanish-language films
2001 comedy films
2001 drama films
2001 independent films
2000s Argentine films